In geometry, the  (from German: middle point) of a triangle is a triangle center: a point defined from the triangle that is invariant under Euclidean transformations of the triangle. It was identified in 1836 by Christian Heinrich von Nagel as the symmedian point of the excentral triangle of the given triangle.

Coordinates
The mittenpunkt has trilinear coordinates

The barycentric coordinates are

Collinearities

The mittenpunkt is at the intersection of the line connecting the centroid and the Gergonne point, the line connecting the incenter and the symmedian point and the line connecting the orthocenter with the Spieker center, thus establishing three collinearities involving the mittenpunkt.

Related figures
The three lines connecting the excenters of the given triangle to the corresponding edge midpoints all meet at the mittenpunkt; thus, it is the center of perspective of the excentral triangle and the median triangle, with the corresponding axis of perspective being the trilinear polar of the Gergonne point. The mittenpunkt is also the centroid of the Mandart inellipse of the given triangle, the ellipse tangent to the triangle at its extouch points.

Notes
The Mittenpunkt also serves as the Gergonne point of the Medial triangle.

References

External links

Triangle centers